Sebastián Sánchez may refer to:

 Sebastián Sánchez (footballer, born 1988), Argentine defender
 Sebastián Sánchez (footballer, born 1989), Uruguayan midfielder